

About 
Jiwanpur is a large village on the Ludhiana-Rahon Road. One of the oldest villages of the state of Punjab, this village has been home to many scholars, politicians, army officers, engineers, doctors, prominent teachers and journalists.

References

Villages in Ludhiana district